The 1980 Intercontinental Cup was an association football match played on 11 February 1981 between Nacional of Uruguay, winners of the 1980 Copa Libertadores, and Nottingham Forest of England, winners of the 1979–80 European Cup. The match was played for the first time at the neutral venue of the  now demolished National Stadium in Tokyo in front of 62,000 fans. Waldemar Victorino was named as man of the match.

Venue

The National Stadium in Tokyo was the venue that hosted this first edition of the Cup, and would also be the usual venue for the rest of the editions held in Tokyo until 2002 Intercontinental Cup, when the final moved to Nissan Stadium in Yokohama. The stadium was also known as "Olympic Stadium" due to it had served as the main stadium for the opening and closing ceremonies, as well as being the venue for track and field events at the 1964 Summer Olympics, 

The Japan national football team's home matches and major football club cup finals (such as J1 League) were usually held at the stadium. The National Stadium was demolished in 2014 to make way for a larger stadium that hosted matches of the 2019 Rugby World Cup and 2020 Summer Olympics.

Match details

See also
1979–80 European Cup
1980 Copa Libertadores
Nottingham Forest F.C. in European football

References

Intercontinental Cup
Intercontinental Cup
Intercontinental Cup
Intercontinental Cup
Intercontinental Cup (football)
Intercontinental Cup (football) matches hosted by Japan
Intercontinental Cup 1980
Intercontinental Cup 1980
Inter
Inter
Intercontinental Cup
Sports competitions in Tokyo
Intercontinental Cup